Spice mixes are blended spices or herbs. When a certain combination of herbs or spices is called for in a recipe, it is convenient to blend these ingredients beforehand. Blends such as chili powder, curry powder, herbes de Provence, garlic salt, and other seasoned salts are traditionally sold pre-made by grocers, and sometimes baking blends such as pumpkin pie spice are also available. These spice mixes are also easily made by the home cook for later use.

Masala

Masala (from Hindi/Urdu masalah, based on Arabic masalih) is a term from the Indian subcontinent for a spice mix.  A masala can be either a combination of dried (and usually dry-roasted) spices, or a paste (such as vindaloo masala) made from a mixture of spices and other ingredients—often garlic, ginger, onions, chilli paste and tomato. Masalas are used extensively in Indian cuisine to add spice and flavour, most familiarly to Western cuisine in chicken tikka masala and chicken curry, or in masala chai. Other South Asian cuisines including Bangladeshi, Nepali, Pakistani and Sri Lankan, Southeast Asian cuisine such as Burmese and the Caribbean regularly use spice mixes.

Notable spice mixes by region

Americas 

 Jerk, a spicy Jamaican dry-rub for meat primarily made with allspice and Scotch bonnet peppers
 Montreal steak spice, a seasoning mix for steaks and grilled meats
 Old Bay Seasoning, a seasoning mix of celery salt, black pepper, crushed red pepper flakes, and paprika originally created in Baltimore and regionally popular in Maryland as well as Mid-Atlantic and Southern States, parts of New England, and the Gulf Coast
 Pumpkin pie spice, a North American blend of cinnamon, clove, ginger, nutmeg, and allspice
 Italian seasoning, a blend of rosemary, thyme, basil and oregano
 Tajín, a Mexican blend of chili powder, salt, and dehydrated lime juice

East and Southeast Asian 

 Five-spice powder, a blend of cassia (Chinese cinnamon), star anise, cloves, and two other spices
 , a Vietnamese blend
 Shichimi, a mix of ground red chili pepper, Japanese pepper, roasted orange peel, black and white sesame seed, hemp seed, ground ginger and nori

European 

 Adobo, a mix of spices used in Spain and Latin America
 Fines herbes, a French blend of parsley, chives, tarragon, and chervil for seasoning delicate dishes
 Beau monde seasoning, salt, onion powder and celery powder - sometimes other ingredients
 Garlic salt, a mixture of dried garlic and table salt
 Herbes de Provence, a Provençal blend of thyme, marjoram, rosemary, basil, bay leaf, and sometimes lavender
 Khmeli suneli, a blend used in Georgia and the Caucasus region
 Lemon pepper, lemon zest, cracked black peppercorns, salt, and spices
 Mixed spice or pudding spice, a British blend of cinnamon, nutmeg, allspice, and other spices
 Mulling spices, a European spice mixture of cinnamon, cloves, allspice, nutmeg and dried fruit
 Quatre épices, a French blend of ground pepper, cloves, nutmeg and ginger
 Seasoned salt, a blend of table salt, herbs, spices, other flavourings
 Sharena sol, a Bulgarian mixture of summer savoury, paprika and salt, with other optional ingredients
 Vadouvan, French version of an Indian masala

Middle East and Africa 

Advieh, a spice mixture used in Iranian cuisine and Mesopotamian cuisine
 Afrinj, an Ethiopian blend that is milder than berbere or mitmita
 Baharat, used throughout the Middle East
 Berbere, an Eritrean and Ethiopian blend
 Hawaij, Yemenite ground spice mixtures used primarily for soups and coffee
 Mitmita, an Ethiopian blend of African birdseye chili peppers, cardamom, cloves and salt
 Ras el hanout, a Maghrebi blend that includes cinnamon and cumin among other spices
 Yaji, a Hausa spice mix for traditional suya and chichinga kebabs in sahelian West Africa. Made from cayenne, ginger, ground peanuts, dried onion, and chili
 Za'atar, a Middle Eastern mix which is both an individual herb and a blend of that herb with sesame seeds and sometimes dried sumac

South Asian 
 Bafat, used in Mangalorean cuisine
 Chaat masala, ground spices used for flavouring chaat
 Curry powder, A blend of spices like coriander, turmeric, cumin, fenugreek, and chili peppers popular in India with many variations
 Garam masala, spice blend used in the Northern regions of the Indian subcontinent
 Kaala masala, black spice blend used in the Indian subcontinent
 Panch phoron, a five-spice blend of whole fenugreek, nigella, fennel, cumin, and mustard or radhuni seeds originating from the Indian subcontinent
 Tandoori masala, spice blend originating from the Indian subcontinent for tandoor-cooked meats
 Thunapaha, a spice blend of coriander, cumin and fennel seed used in Sri Lankan traditional cuisine

See also

 List of culinary herbs and spices
 Seasoning

References

External links